Barnston is a village and civil parish in Essex, England.  It is located  2 miles southeast from Great Dunmow and is 9 miles north-northwest from the county town of Chelmsford.  The village is in the district of Uttlesford and in the parliamentary constituency of Saffron Walden.  The village has its own Parish Council and local football team Barnston A.F.C.

The local churches are St Andrews and the Mission Evangelical Church.

According to the 2001 census it had a population of 850, increasing to 947 at the census 2011

Governance
Barnston is part of the electoral ward termed Barnston and High Easter. The total population of this ward at the 2011 census was 1,701.

Notable residents 
 Bridget Plowden, educational reformer
 Thomas Watson, puritan, retired to the village and died there

Barnston Village Hall 
The Village Hall was opened around 1960 and was built with funds raised by many dedicated locals, organising fetes and many other activities to buy bricks at 6d each.

Notable contributors to the effort of building the hall were :- Don Churchill, he did much of the brick laying and woodwork, he was also heavily involved with Barnston Football Club especially in the first fifteen years of its life when he was the Club Secretary. Mr Salmon, supplied and erected the iron support structure. Mr Fred J Gill, not himself a Barnston resident but initially a passer-by who couldn't bear to see the growing pile of bricks and little progress on the building, he eventually couldn't stand it anymore and volunteered to help Don Churchill build the hall.

See also
 The Hundred Parishes

References

External links 

Barnston Village Website
Barnston Village Hall Website
Barnston AFC

Villages in Essex
Uttlesford